Ating Alamin was an agricultural and livelihood program produced by Gerry Geronimo Productions Incorporated and broadcast by MBS/PTV/NBN, ABC, IBC, and UNTV. Hosted by Gerry Geronimo, it premiered on October 5, 1980. The show concluded on July 10, 2016.

History
The program was hosted, produced, written and directed by Adolfo "Ka Gerry" Geronimo. It started as a radio program in 1974, aiming to improve Filipino people's lives by sharing insights and innovations in agriculture, crops, fishery livestock and home industries. He pioneered agricultural programming on television, and later became a vehicle for him to be appointed as one of the sectoral representatives for the peasants during the 10th Congress of the Philippines as well as his participation in the 1992 and 1998 Senatorial elections.

It was later evolved as a television program which premiered on October 5, 1980, on MBS Channel 4, and also traveled through different television stations through the years. The program was also aired internationally on ABS-CBN Sports and Action provided by TFC from 2009 to 2020.

The program, however, ended its run on Philippine television on July 10, 2016, after the program was suspended indefinitely on PTV Channel 4 by the Presidential Communications Operations Office under the leadership of then-PCOO Secretary Martin Andanar; which he focused PTV to become a News and Public Affairs channel. Despite this development, viewers can still catch up the program through its YouTube channel for free.

Segments 
Talasaysayan sa Kabuhayan
Dagdag Kaalaman
Question and Answer
Gabayan sa Kabuhayan
Extension Service
Special Feature

Host 
Adolfo "Ka Gerry" Geronimo - (1980–2016)

Accolades 
Hall of Fame - Catholic Mass Media Awards
Hall of Fame - KBP Golden Dove Awards
Best Livelihood Program and Host - Gandingan Awards (2011)
Seal of Approval - Anak TV Awards (2011)
Recipient, Long-Running TV Shows - 16th PMPC Star Awards for Television (2002)
Nominated - PMPC Star Awards for Television (1988–2016)
Best Television Show (Top 1) - Gawad CCP para sa Telebisyon (1988)

References

External links 

 AtingAlamin.org
 Gerry Geronimo Productions Official Site

Television shows about agriculture
Intercontinental Broadcasting Corporation original programming
People's Television Network original programming
The Filipino Channel original programming
TV5 (Philippine TV network) original programming
UNTV (Philippines) original programming
1980 Philippine television series debuts
2016 Philippine television series endings
1980s Philippine television series
1990s Philippine television series
2000s Philippine television series
Filipino-language television shows
Philippine television shows
YouTube channels